Lamont Antonio Burns (born March 16, 1974) is a former American football guard in the National Football League for the New York Jets and Washington Redskins. Burns attended Walter Hines Page Senior High School in Greensboro, North Carolina, and went to East Carolina University on a football scholarship to play college football.

References

External links
 Las Vegas Outlaws

American football offensive guards
East Carolina Pirates football players
New York Jets players
Washington Redskins players
Las Vegas Outlaws (XFL) players
Living people
1974 births